Charles Hoadley Ashe Ross (22 July 1852 – 5 February 1911) was an English sportsman who played both cricket and tennis, the latter of which was more extensive. Ross was a quarter finalist in singles at the 1886 Wimbledon Championships, and a two time semi finalist in men's doubles in 1885 and 1886. He played competitive tennis from 1884 to 1891, and reached fifteen finals, and won seven titles.

Tennis career
Ross entered his first tournament at the Sussex County Lawn Tennis Tournament in 1884, and progressed to the final before losing to Charles Lacy Sweet 3–1 in sets. In a period when international travel was difficult, he chose to play at the inaugural Ceylon Championships held at the Hill Club, Nuwara Eliya, British Ceylon where he won the title.

In 1885 he competed at the London Championships staged at the London Athletic Club, Stamford Bridge, where he won the title against Ernest Wool Lewis by 3 sets to 2.  He then won the Sussex County Lawn Tennis Tournament by a walkover against William C. Taylor. Ross was also finalist at Brighton Lawn Tennis Club Tournament losing 3–1 in sets to the American No 2 player James Dwight, he also reached the finals of the very first British Covered Court Championships played on indoor wood courts, before losing to Herbert Lawford 7–5, 6–3, 6–0. At the Bournemouth Open Tournament he progressed to the final of that event, but lost to Ernest Wool Lewis again in straight sets. He also a losing finalist at the East Gloucestershire Championships at Cheltenham to Irelands Ernest Browne.

In 1886 he won the Leicester Lawn Tennis Club Tournament against John Redfern Deykin winning by 3 sets to 1. At the 1886 Wimbledon Championships he made it the quarter finals stage, but was beaten by Herbert Wilberforce 3–6, 2–6, 6–4, 6–2, 6–4. He then won East Grinstead Open against W.E. Seldon 2–0 in sets. He failed to defend his London Championship title to Ernest Wool Lewis who avenged his previous years loss. He then played at the East of England Championships at Felixstowe where he reached the final, but lost to Alfred Penn Gaskell 3–0 in sets.

In 1888 he won another two titles, and reached the final of another. At the Cambridgeshire Lawn Tennis Tournament he won that title defeating Alfred E. Walker by 3 sets to 1. He then reached the final of Edgbaston Open Tournament, before losing to James Baldwin by 3 sets to 1.  His final title win was at the Warwickshire Championships held at Leamington Spa against John Redfern Deykin. The same year he reached the quarter finals stage of the South of England Championships held at Eastbourne, but was beaten by Harry Sibthorpe Barlow.

In 1890 he reached the semi finals of the Sussex Championships at Brighton, before losing Herbert Baddeley. Ross played his final tournament at the Colchester Championships in 1891, where he progressed to the semi finals, before losing to Herbert William Kersey.

Cricket career
Charles Ross was also a first class cricketer and played for Middlesex County Cricket Club during the later half of the 19th century.

References

Sources
 Player Profile: Charles Ross". www.wimbledon.com. All England Lawn Tennis and Croquet Club.  
 Silva, Revatha (23 August 2018). "103rd Tennis Nationals – The past champions". The Morning - Sri Lanka News.

1852 births
1911 deaths
English cricketers
Middlesex cricketers
19th-century male tennis players
English male tennis players
Tennis people from Somerset
British male tennis players